"Pa' Mayte" is a song by Colombian singer Carlos Vives, released as the second single from his fifth studio album La Tierra del Olvido in 1995. The song was written by Carlos Vives, Ivan Benavides and Ernesto Ocampo.

Charts

References

1995 singles
Carlos Vives songs
Spanish-language songs
1995 songs
PolyGram singles
Songs written by Carlos Vives